Paramphisile is an extinct genus of prehistoric bony fish that lived from the early to middle Eocene.

References

Eocene fish
Gasterosteiformes
Fossils of Italy